The Norwegian Writers for Children (NBU) was founded in 1947. The association, composed of authors who write fiction for children and young people, promotes the interests of writers of books for children and young people and encourages literature for children and young people. NBU has almost 300 members.

See also

References

External links
Official website

Organisations based in Oslo
Organizations established in 1947
Norwegian writers' organisations
Educational projects
Norwaco
1947 establishments in Norway